The BCJR algorithm is an algorithm for maximum a posteriori decoding of error correcting codes defined on trellises (principally convolutional codes).  The algorithm is named after its inventors: Bahl, Cocke, Jelinek and Raviv.  This algorithm is critical to modern iteratively-decoded error-correcting codes, including turbo codes and low-density parity-check codes.

Steps involved
Based on the trellis:

 Compute forward probabilities 
 Compute backward probabilities 
 Compute smoothed probabilities based on other information (i.e. noise variance for AWGN, bit crossover probability for binary symmetric channel)

Variations

SBGT BCJR
Berrou, Glavieux and Thitimajshima simplification.

Log-Map BCJR

Implementations
 Susa framework implements BCJR algorithm for forward error correction codes and channel equalization in C++.

See also
 Forward-backward algorithm
 Maximum a posteriori (MAP) estimation
 Hidden Markov model

References

External links
 The online textbook: Information Theory, Inference, and Learning Algorithms, by David J.C. MacKay, discusses the BCJR algorithm in chapter 25.
 The implementation of BCJR algorithm in Susa signal processing framework

Error detection and correction